The Delta C, or Thor-Delta C was an American expendable launch system used for thirteen orbital launches between 1963 and 1969. It was a member of the Delta family of rockets.

The first stage was a Thor missile in the DSV-2A configuration, and the second stage was the Delta D, which was derived from the earlier Delta. The baseline Delta C used an Altair-2 third stage, whilst the Delta C1 had an FW-4D third stage, which provided a higher payload capacity than the Altair. It is unclear whether two or three launches were made using the C1 configuration.

The Delta C was launched from Cape Canaveral Air Force Station Launch Complex 17. Most launches carried NASA research satellites into low Earth orbit.

References 

Delta (rocket family)